West Virginia Route 214 is a north–south state highway located in the western portion of the U.S. state of West Virginia. Although the route maintains an east–west routing for most of its length, the route is signed as north–south. The southern terminus of the route is at West Virginia Route 3 southeast of Griffithsville. The northern terminus is at an interchange with U.S. Route 119 south of South Charleston, where the roadway continues northward as West Virginia Route 601.

WV 214 was formerly part of WV 14 (as was WV 114). Although it parallels US 119, it was never part of that route (which followed present WV 94 until Corridor G was built).

Major intersections

References

214
Transportation in Kanawha County, West Virginia
Transportation in Lincoln County, West Virginia